Gerson Bruno da Costa Barros (born 1 April 1987), commonly known as Gerson Barros, is an Angolan footballer who currently plays as a goalkeeper for Petro Atlético.

Career statistics

Club

Notes

International

References

1987 births
Living people
Angolan footballers
Angola international footballers
Association football goalkeepers
Girabola players
G.D. Fabril players
Santos Futebol Clube de Angola players
Atlético Petróleos de Luanda players